Lauren States (born 1956) is a former Chief of Technology and then Vice President of Strategy and Transformation for IBM's Software Group Division.

Life
States has held numerous senior executive positions within IBM Software Group, IBM Corporate Strategy, and IBM Sales and Distribution.

States holds a Bachelor of Science in Economics from the Wharton School of the University of Pennsylvania and a Certificate in Business Excellence from Columbia University Business School Executive Education. She also completed a fellowship in Harvard’s Advanced Leadership Initiative in 2015.

States was named one of Savoy Magazine’s 2017 Power 300: Most Influential Black Corporate Directors. In 2014, she was inducted into the Women in Technology International Hall of Fame.

States serves as a director for Code Nation and a board trustee for International House of New York.

References 

American women computer scientists
American computer scientists
Wharton School of the University of Pennsylvania alumni
1956 births
Living people
IBM people
21st-century American women